The prevalent means of connecting to the Internet in Germany is DSL, introduced by Deutsche Telekom in 1999. Other technologies such as Cable, FTTH and FTTB (fiber), Satellite, UMTS/HSDPA (mobile) and LTE are available as alternatives.

DSL
In Germany, DSL is the prevalent internet access technology with over 30 million subscribers. For residential services the Annex B versions of ADSL, ADSL2+, and VDSL2 are used. With over 12 million customers the incumbent Deutsche Telekom is the market leader. Other DSL providers either operate their own hardware on local loops rented from the incumbent in a local loop unbundling (LLU) arrangement, and/or purchase bit-stream access from a provider that operates DSL hardware. The end user typically expects a TAE connector socket to connect their modem.

As of January 2014, a typical monthly cost for "dual flatrate" internet and telephone service start at €25 for ADSL2+ (16 Mbit/s downlink, 1 Mbit/s uplink) and €30 for VDSL2 (50 Mbit/s downlink, 10 Mbit/s uplink). Some of the major nationwide DSL providers are:
 Deutsche Telekom
 Congstar
 1&1
 Vodafone
 o2
 Versatel

Providers such as Deutsche Telekom and Vodafone also offer DSL-based triple play services with IPTV, which requires at least 16 Mbit/s for HD quality.

Starting in 2013, all newly deployed Deutsche Telekom VDSL2 nodes support G.vector technology. Beginning in August 2014, vectored VDSL2 service with data rates of up to 100 Mbit/s downlink and 40 Mbit/s uplink is available from Deutsche Telekom. Existing VDSL2 deployments in major cities will be upgraded to G.vector in 2016. Deutsche Telekom is planning to introduce 500 Mbit/s service using G.fast in 2017 at the earliest.

Symmetric DSL (SDSL) connections using G.shdsl technology are marketed to business customers. Providers offering SDSL include Deutsche Telekom, QSC, and Versatel.

Cable 
According to a statistic from Statista, Vodafone, Germany's largest cable internet provider, had 7.65 Million cable internet customers at the end of Q2, 2020. Though still significantly lower the amount of DSL customers, this number has risen in recent years. This is likely due to the higher maximum speeds compared to DSL and relatively well priced plans.

Internet via cable is offered by Kabel Deutschland and Unitymedia (separated geographically), both of which are now owned by Vodafone. There are other smaller providers that do not operate nationwide, such as Tele Columbus's child company, PYUR. Since November 2014 both Unitymedia and Kabel Deutschland offer connections with up to 200Mbit/s in downstream. Unitymedia started its 400 Mbit/s connections in January 2016, Vodafone Kabel Deutschland offers 400 Mbit/s since June 2016. As of January 2021, both companies offer cable internet up to 1000 Mbit/s costing (not incl. special offers for new customers or similar) €88 per month from PYUR and €49.99 per month from Vodafone. Vodafone has the highest nationwide availability for gigabit internet, now at 22 million households according to an update from Vodafone. Both companies also offer upload speeds up to 50 Mbit/s. These plans currently use DOCSIS 3.1, with support for EuroDOCSIS 3.0. Vodafone plans the first field tests of DOCSIS 4.0 (with support for up to 10 Gbit/s downstream and 6 Gbit/s upstream) as soon as the new hardware generation becomes available. These should be available before 2022 at the Düsseldorfer Digitalisierungskonzern. Cable internet is currently the most readily available way to get gigabit internet as a private customer, however fiber internet offers the same or faster speeds in a growing but still limited list of regions.

Alternative technologies
While DSL and Cable are the prevalent connection technology in Germany, other technologies may offer lower prices or better availability and speed.

FTTH and FTTB
Deutsche Telekom started offering FTTH/FTTB in select regions in 2011, with up to 200 Mbit/s downstream and 100 Mbit/s upstream. As of January 2014, Deutsche Telekom FTTH was available in 884,000 households, at a price point of €55 for 100/50 Mbit/s and €60 for 200/100 Mbit/s service. Regional providers also offer FTTH/FTTB services, e.g. Since late 2018, more companies have started increasing fiber (FTTH and FTTB) internet availability across Germany such as Vodafone, Deutsche Telekom, Greenfiber, Deutsche Glasfaser and 1&1. As of May 2021, fiber offers internet speeds of up to 10.000 Mbit/s in select regions.

Satellite
Satellite internet is geographically more widely available than land-based technologies. In places where land-based internet access technology (DSL, cable, FTTx) is not available, satellite and UMTS/LTE are the primary means of high-speed internet access. As opposed to UMTS/LTE, satellite internet providers offer flatrates.

UMTS/HSDPA and LTE
Deutsche Telekom and Vodafone offer fixed location internet service on their UMTS and LTE networks. As of December 2014, there are no flatrates available. The included data volume is generally higher for fixed location service than for mobile service at the same price point. As of December 2014, both Deutsche Telekom and Vodafone limit the speed to 384 kbit/s after the data volume of between 10 and 30 GB is used up.

UMTS/HSDPA with up to 42.2 Mbit/s and LTE with up to 375 Mbit/s is offered by all four network operators: Deutsche Telekom, Vodafone, o2, and E-Plus. In 2013, Chip measured average downstream UMTS/GPRS data rates of between 2.4 and 7.9 Mbit/s and average downstream LTE/UMTS/GPRS data rates of between 3.2 and 16.0 Mbit/s, depending on both provider and location (rural vs. city). In the same test, LTE coverage was measured at between 15% and 80%, depending on provider and location (rural vs. city). A typical 2-year contract with 2GB of LTE speed, unlimited minutes and texts costs around €40 per month.

History

Early history 
The first Internet email from the US to Germany was sent in 1984. Germany was the third country on CSNET, after the U.S. initiated the network in 1981 and Israel joined earlier in 1984.

The postal service Deutsche Bundespost held a monopoly on telecommunications until 1989. Thereafter, Deutsche Telekom was spun off as a separate company, in preparation for the privatization of the postal service. As a government run and owned corporation, Deutsche Telekom effectively remained the monopoly ISP until its privatization in 1995, and the dominant ISP thereafter. Until the 21st century, Deutsche Telekom controlled almost all Internet access by individuals and small businesses.

Bildschirmtext (BTX) was an early data network service offered by Deutsche Bundespost starting in 1983. Later, under the tenure of Deutsche Telekom, it was marketed as an alternative to the Internet, but was discontinued by 2001.

DSL
Prior to the introduction of DSL and cable internet, voice-band modems and ISDN BRI were the most common residential internet access technologies. ISDN was widespread, with 333 ISDN BRIs per 1000 persons in 2005. DSL was introduced in Germany by Deutsche Telekom on July 1, 1999, under the brand name T-DSL, with 768 kbit/s downstream and 128 kbit/s upstream. T-DSL speeds were increased by Deutsche Telekom to 1536/192 kbit/s upstream/downstream in September 2002, 3072/384 kbit/s in April 2004, and 6016/576 kbit/s in mid-2005. Deutsche Telekom introduced ADSL2+ service with 16000/1024 kbit/s in spring 2006 and VDSL2 with 50000/10000 kbit/s triple play service under the brand name Entertain in October 2006. VDSL2 service without bundled IPTV was introduced in June 2009. In 2011, Deutsche Telekom introduced Voice over IP (VoIP) services over ADSL2+ Annex J. In February 2013, Deutsche Telekom started switching existing POTS and ISDN voice service subscribers to VoIP service. In August 2014, Deutsche Telekom became the first service provider to offer vectored VDSL2 using G.vector technology, offering 100/40 Mbit/s.

In 1998, the Federal Network Agency (BNetzA) established regulations for local loop unbundling, enabling providers such as Vodafone, Telefónica Germany (O2), QSC, and Versatel to rent the local loop from the incumbent Deutsche Telekom and to operate their own access networks, placing their DSLAMs either in their own central offices (CO) or co-located with the incumbent's. These ISPs either offered their services directly to the subscriber, or sold bit-stream access to other ISPs. To compete with the incumbent's POTS and ISDN voice services, alternative providers introduced voice over IP (VoIP) bundled with their DSL internet services under the name Komplettanschluss. Starting in 2004, Deutsche Telekom provided IP-level bitstream access to other providers under the name T-DSL resale. The "resold" T-DSL was only available to subscribers of Deutsche Telekom's POTS/ISDN service. In July 2008, Deutsche Telekom introduced bitstream access which does not require the incumbent's POTS/ISDN service, enabling competing ISPs to provide combined internet and VoIP service (Komplettanschluss) on Deutsche Telekom-operated local loops. G.vector is not compatible with local loop unbundling, because G.vector can only be feasibly deployed by one provider per serving area interface. The regulator BNetzA conceived a "vectoring list", on which providers can claim cabinets on a first-come-first-served basis. To prevent a monopoly, this provider is required to offer bit-stream access to its competitors.

Cable
Cable internet access in Germany began with pilot projects in December 2003 and wide deployment followed in late 2004. A number of political reasons prevented an earlier market adoption of cable internet in Germany. Until 2001, Deutsche Telekom was the monopoly owner of the German coax cable network, and had no intention to offer in-house competition to its DSL service. Pressure from regulatory agencies forced Deutsche Telekom to sell its cable network, however Deutsche Telekom took measures to delay a possible cable internet offering.

LTE
LTE internet access was introduced by Deutsche Telekom in 2010 and by Vodafone in 2011. As part of the 2010 spectrum auction, the regulatory agency BNetzA required bidders to use the spectrum to provide broadband internet access to regions with only limited land-line broadband (DSL, cable, FTTH) access. For the purpose of land-line broadband replacement, Deutsche Telekom and Vodafone introduced fixed location LTE service.

Internet censorship and surveillance

Internet censorship in Germany is practiced by law as well as the effect of some court decisions. An example of content censored by law is the removal of web sites from Google search results that deny the holocaust, which is a felony under German law.

Most cases of Internet censorship in Germany, however, occur after state court rulings. One example is a 2009 court order, forbidding German Wikipedia to disclose the identity of Wolfgang Werlé and Manfred Lauber, two criminals convicted of the murder of the Bavarian actor Walter Sedlmayr. In another case, Wikipedia.de (an Internet domain run by Wikimedia Deutschland) was prohibited from pointing to the actual Wikipedia content. The court order was as a temporary injunction in a case filed by politician Lutz Heilmann over claims in a German Wikipedia article regarding his past involvement with the former German Democratic Republic's intelligence service Stasi.

Notes

See also
 Internet censorship in Germany
 Pirate Party Germany

References